Andrew Phillips is a historian from the ancient borough of Colchester in Essex in the East of England.  He is a former lecturer in history at the Colchester Institute.  He is a contributor of historical columns to the Essex County Standard and he is the author of 
Colchester: A History, Ten Men and Colchester, Steam and the Road to Glory: The Paxman Story.  He is the facilitator of the Colchester Recalled oral history project.

External links
 Colchester Recalled

British historians
People from Colchester
Year of birth missing (living people)
Living people